David Ochterlony Dyce Sombre (18 December 1808 – 1 July 1851), also known as D. O. Dyce Sombre and David Dyce Sombre, was an Anglo-Indian held to be the first person of Asian descent to be elected to the British Parliament.  He was elected to represent the Sudbury constituency in July 1841, but was removed in April 1842 due to bribery in the election.
He was named after the British Resident at Delhi, David Ochterlony.

Lineage and background
David Ochterlony Dyce Sombre was great-grandson of Walter Reinhardt Sombre (c. 1725 – 1778), a mercenary soldier who lived for many years in India. Walter Reinhardt Sombre had two wives, both of whom were Indian Muslim women; the senior wife is known only as Badi Bibi ("senior lady"), while the second wife was the famous Begum Samru (c. 1753–1836). The name "Samru" is the local corruption of the name "Sombre", and Begum, a Kashmiri Muslim by birth, converted in 1781 to the Catholic faith. A fabulously wealthy woman, she was left with no surviving children or grandchildren in her old age. Her husband had only one son by Badi Bibi his first wife; that young man, who died in 1799, had left behind a daughter named Juliana, who married a man named George Alexander Dyce and gave birth to several children, including David Ochterlony Dyce. He was selected by Begum Samru, the second wife of his great-grandfather, to succeed to her vast estates. He thereupon added the surname "Sombre" to his existing names and came to be known as David Ochterlony Dyce Sombre.

The details are as follows. The mercenary soldier Walter Reinhardt Sombre (c. 1725–1778) had one son by his senior wife, Badi Bibi. The boy, born in 1764, was initially named Zafar Yab Khan and raised more or less as a Muslim by his mother in a mixed household. However, he accepted Catholic baptism in 1781 (aged 17), three years after the death of his Catholic father. Incidentally, his widowed step-mother, Begum Samru, also accepted Catholic baptism at the same time. Upon his baptism, the young man's name was changed to "Walter Balthazzar Reinhardt," or (according to a biography of his grandson) "Aloysius Balthazzar Reinhardt." 

He married Julia Anne (or Juliana) Le Fevre (1770–1815), daughter of a captain in Begum Samru's service. Julia Anna was also known as Juliana, as Madame Reybaud and as Bhai Begum. The couple had two children, a son, Aloysius Reinhardt, who died young and is buried in the Akbar Church in Agra, and a daughter, Julia Anne (or Juliana). Zafar Yab alias Walter/Aloysius Reinhardt died in 1799 of cholera. He was survived by his wife (who died in 1815) and their daughter (born 1787/1789 - died 1820), who married in 1803, to George Alexander Dyce (died April 1838, buried at Fort William, Calcutta). Begam Sumroo looked after the deceased young mother's child, David, who was brought up after his mother's death in 1820 as the Begum's son and heir.
 This George Alexander Dyce was the illegitimate half-caste (i.e. mixed-race, Anglo-Indian) son of a Major General Dyce. This couple had several children, of whom four are mentioned in subsequent papers and histories; they are:
 David Ochterlony (b. 18 December 1808), the subject of this entry,
 George Archibald (b. 1 August 1810, died within a year),
 Anna Maria (b. 24 December 1813) who married John Rose Troup, a former East India Company general.
 Georgiana (b. 2 September 1807; alternatively 1815–1867). She married an Italian mercenary soldier named Paolo Solaroli (1796–1878) who was later to become a wealthy and ranking aristocrat. Born into a humble family from Novara, Piedmont, Paolo Solaroli joined the Sardinian army. He later became an officer and diplomat who was ennobled in the 1840s by Carlo Alberto of Sardinia, became Baron, by 1864, and was elevated to the title of Marchese di Briona in 1867 by Vittorio Emmanuele II. He had descendants and left them an enormous estate at his death. His castle was acquired in 1864 by the government. In the 1840s, he was styled Baron Paolo Solaroli, but was referred to by his sister-in-law, Anna Maria (Ochterlony) Troup, and her lawyers as Peter Solaroli.

Religious position
Although educated by Protestant missionaries, David Ochterlony Dyce Sombre was brought up a Catholic. He added Sombre to his name on being formally nominated by the Begam as her sole heir and successor. She transferred to him her wealth, and the administration of her principality but her attempts to have him accepted by the British as ruler on her death were to no avail.

When the Begam died in 1836, the British took possession of Sardhana, all the arms which she had brought from them to equip her army, as well as the lands of Badshapur, which were her private property. They also failed to honour undertakings to continue the many pensions paid from the revenue. David's attempts to have these wrongs rectified were unsuccessful, although compensation for the arms was eventually granted long after his death. He was embroiled in attempts by his father to grab his fortune.  His personal life was marked by extravagant spending – gambling, womanising, and even the occasional pimping – to please European friends and better-off Anglo-Indian friends such as Sir Charles Metcalfe Ochterlony.

Marriage

After a visit to China, David set out for England and the Grand Tour of Europe. He married on 26 September 1840 the Honourable Mary Anne Jervis, third daughter of the 2nd Viscount St Vincent, his only daughter by his second wife, described as "accomplished singer, dancer, and composer" and also as an associate of the Duke of Wellington; the marriage took place despite quarrels over his fiancée's social life and the religious affiliation of their future (and never born) children. He also got himself elected as MP for Sudbury in July 1841, and was then deposed in April 1842 after objections from the loser. He accused his wife of adultery with various men including her own father, and his life turned for the worse, when his wife had him certified insane and held under restraint, with the support and consent of his sisters Mrs Anna May Troup (1812–1867) and Baroness Georgiana Solaroli (1815–1867) and their husbands.

Escape, medical reports and death
In September that year, David escaped his guards and fled to France, where an attempt to have him extradited failed. Doctors all over Europe examined him and found he was perfectly sane, but his attempts to reverse the judgement were brushed aside. He managed to obtain part of his estate with an allowance of 4,000 pounds deducted for his wife. Meanwhile, he travelled from one end of Europe to the other. Finally, with a change of Government, there seemed a chance of success. He returned to England with indemnity from arrest, but a few days before the case was due to be heard he died suddenly in excruciating agony from a septic foot on 1 July 1851.

He was buried at once in an unmarked grave, which has not been touched since, yet his body was also returned to India to be buried in Sardhana. His will providing for the establishment of a school in Sardhana was contested by his estranged wife, whom he had disinherited, on the grounds that he was still insane. She won the case sometime around 1856, and became the richest woman in England. 
Later on, she was also known as Lady Forester, through her marriage to George Weld-Forester, 3rd Baron Forester on 8 November 1862. The former Mrs Dyce Sombre died childless in 1893, and her fortune presumably passed to the Weld-Forester family.

References

External links 
 

 Oxford DNB entry

Anglo-Indian people
Whig (British political party) MPs
Members of the Parliament of the United Kingdom for English constituencies
UK MPs 1841–1847
1808 births
1851 deaths
British politicians of Indian descent